HII (formerly Huntington Ingalls Industries, Inc.) is the largest military shipbuilding company in the United States as well as a provider of professional services to partners in government and industry. HII, ranked No. 371 on the Fortune 500, was formed on March 31, 2011, as a spin-off of Northrop Grumman.

HII comprises three divisions: Newport News Shipbuilding, Ingalls Shipbuilding, and Mission Technologies. HII's Newport News and Ingalls Shipbuilding divisions in Virginia and Mississippi, respectively, have built more ships in more ship classes than any other U.S. naval shipbuilder. HII's Mission Technologies division provides a wide range of professional services through its Fleet Support, Mission Driven Innovative Solutions/Defense and Federal Solutions, Nuclear and Environmental, and Oil and Gas groups.

In April 2022, Huntington Ingalls Industries officially changed its name to HII.

History

When it spun off as a new company on March 31, 2011, Huntington Ingalls Industries comprised Northrop Grumman’s shipbuilding businesses in Newport News, Virginia, and Pascagoula, Mississippi.

Since its creation, HII has built and expanded its professional and government services through the acquisitions of UniversalPegasus International, the S.M. Stoller Corporation, Camber Corporation, Novonics, the Columbia Group's Engineering Solutions division, G2 Inc., and Fulcrum IT Services.

In 2016, HII established a third division, Technical Solutions, comprising the company's services capabilities.

Huntington Ingalls Industries is named for the founders of its shipbuilding divisions: Collis Potter Huntington, who founded Newport News Shipbuilding and Drydock Company, and Robert Ingersoll Ingalls Sr., who established Ingalls Shipbuilding.

Divisions
 Newport News Shipbuilding, Newport News, Virginia (U.S. Navy nuclear aircraft carriers, submarines, refueling and complex overhaul, carrier inactivation)
 Ingalls Shipbuilding, Pascagoula, Mississippi (U.S. Navy surface combatants, amphibious warships, and U.S. Coast Guard National Security Cutters)
 Mission Technologies, (U.S. unified combatant command support, U.S. Navy fleet support, USAF and Air National Guard training support, software engineering and IT solutions, cybersecurity, other DoD training, unmanned systems, intelligence analysis, Department of Energy nuclear operations, nuclear fabrication, oil and gas services)

Facilities
HII operates facilities in several key locations across the US:
 Newport News Shipbuilding, Newport News, Virginia (nuclear-powered aircraft carriers and submarines, refueling and complex overhaul, aircraft carrier inactivation)
 Ingalls Shipbuilding, Pascagoula, Mississippi (U.S. Navy surface combatants, amphibious assault ships; U.S. Coast Guard national security cutters)
 Virginia Beach, Virginia (fleet support, training)
 San Diego, California (fleet support and repair)
Huntsville, Alabama (modeling and simulation, training, professional services)
Fairfax, Virginia (IT and cybersecurity services)

Former facilities
 Gulfport, Mississippi (composite R&D, composite components)
 Tallulah, Louisiana (components and subassemblies, closed in 2011)
 Waggaman, Louisiana (closed in 2011)
 Avondale Shipyard, New Orleans, Louisiana (amphibs, auxiliaries, closed in October 2014)

Projects
HII's 2019 order backlog amounts to $41 billion.

Gerald R. Ford-class aircraft carriers
HII is to build ten Gerald R. Ford-class aircraft carriers for the US Navy. It is scheduled to deliver one carrier every five years starting in 2015.

In 2019, the U.S. Navy awarded Huntington Ingalls Industries a $15.2 billion block contract for the detail design and construction of Enterprise (CVN-80) and Doris Miller (CVN-81).

Aircraft carrier Refueling and Complex Overhaul (RCOH)
Newport News Shipbuilding (NNS) is the only shipyard to perform RCOH work on Nimitz-class aircraft carriers. The nearly four-year project is performed once during a carrier's 50-year life and includes refueling of nuclear reactors, as well as significant repair, upgrade and modernization work.

NNS completed RCOH work on the fifth ship, USS Abraham Lincoln (CVN-72), in May 2017, and USS George Washington (CVN-73) arrived in August 2017 to begin its RCOH. NNS is currently supporting the pre-advanced planning effort for the USS John C. Stennis (CVN-74) RCOH.

Aircraft carrier inactivation
Newport News is the only shipyard to provide for the inactivation of nuclear-powered aircraft carriers. Once the service life of a carrier is complete, the ship comes to the shipyard for defueling of its nuclear reactors. The inactivation of the USS Enterprise (CVN-65) is complete, and is the first nuclear carrier to undergo the process.

Virginia-class attack submarines
Newport News is one of only two US shipyards capable of designing and building nuclear-powered submarines. Currently, NNS is building the most advanced attack submarines in the world—the Virginia class. NNS has delivered 17 Virginia-class boats and work continues on 11 boats. Indiana (SSN 789) was delivered to the U.S. Navy in June 2018.

Submarine design and engineering
Newport News Shipbuilding designs and provides on-site installation of state-of-the-art technologies for the Los Angeles-class and Seawolf-class attack submarines. NNS also supports Electric Boat on the Columbia-class ballistic missile submarine program.

America-class amphibious assault ships
USS America (LHA 6) was delivered in April 2014 and commissioned October 11, 2014. It is first in the new class of amphibious assault ships for the U.S. Navy, replacing USS Tarawa (LHA 1). Ingalls’ next ship in the class, Tripoli (LHA 7), is scheduled to be delivered in 2019. The ship was christened on Sept. 16, 2017.

On June 16, 2017, Ingalls Shipbuilding was awarded $3.1 billion contract to build Bougainville (LHA 8). Construction started on LHA 8 on October 15, 2018, and the ship's keel was laid on March 13, 2019.

Arleigh Burke-class destroyers
On September 27, 2018, Ingalls Shipbuilding won a $5.1 billion multi-year contract to build an additional six DDG-51s. These destroyers are equipped with the Navy's Aegis Combat System. The first Flight III ship, Jack. H. Lucas (DDG-125), started fabrication on May 7, 2018. Ingalls has built and delivered 31 ships to the U.S. Navy, with four more under construction. Paul Ignatius (DDG-117), is scheduled for commissioning on July 27 in Fort Lauderdale, Florida.

San Antonio-class landing platform docks (LPDs)
Ingalls Shipbuilding is building the entire San Antonio class of ships, the newest addition to the Navy's 21st century amphibious assault force. LPDs 17 to 27 have been delivered to the U.S. Navy. Ingalls currently has two San Antonio-class ships under construction. The keel of Fort Lauderdale (LPD-28) was authenticated in the fall of 2017, and the ship is scheduled to be launched in the first quarter of 2020. The keel of Richard M. McCool Jr. (LPD-29) was authenticated on April 12, 2019. On March 26, 2019, Ingalls received a $1.4 billion detailed design and construction contract for the first Flight II ship, LPD-30.

U.S. Coast Guard National Security Cutters
National Security Cutters, also referred to as the Legend Class, are the flagships of the Coast Guard's cutter fleet, and are designed to replace the 378-foot Hamilton-class high-endurance cutters, which entered service during the 1960s. The current Program of Record is for 11 ships, of which the first eight have been successfully delivered to the U.S. Coast Guard. Construction is underway on the company's ninth NSC, Stone (WMSL 758). On December 21, 2018, Ingalls received two contracts from the U.S. Coast Guard to build a 10th and 11th NSC. The contracts are valued at $468.75 million and $462.13 million, respectively.

Technical Solutions contracts

 Technical Solutions’ Mission Driven Innovative Solutions group (HII-MDIS) is providing the U.S. Army's Product Manager Force Protection Systems maintenance, repair, supply support, fielding, engineering, configuration management and training.
 Technical Solutions' Fleet Support Group is providing engineering, technical, repair and logistical support to the U.S. Navy's Coastal Riverine Forces.
 Through a joint venture (as N3B) to manage the Los Alamos Legacy Cleanup Contract at the Department of Energy's Los Alamos National Laboratory (LANL).
 In a joint venture with Kellogg Brown and Root's (KBR) Government Services division, HII's Technical Solutions division to establish and manage Australia's new Naval Shipbuilding College.

References

External links

Companies based in Newport News, Virginia
Companies listed on the New York Stock Exchange
2008 establishments in Virginia
American companies established in 2008
Corporate spin-offs
Manufacturing companies established in 2008
Manufacturing companies based in Virginia
Defense companies of the United States